Parapachycladina is an extinct genus of conodonts in the family Ellisoniidae, from the Early Triassic of the Beisi Formation in Guangxi Province, China.

References

External links 

 Parapachycladina at fossilworks.org (retrieved 7 May 2016)

Prioniodinida genera
Early Triassic fish
Triassic conodonts
Triassic fish of Asia
Fossils of China
Endemic fauna of Guangxi